Crouçie d'où là is the debut studio album by Icelandic singer-songwriter Emilíana Torrini. It was released in 1995 in Iceland by Japis records. The album consists entirely of cover songs. The title of the record is a play on words. It is spelled as if it were a French phrase, but it is a homonym of the Icelandic word Krúsídúlla which means cutie pie. The songs include "Crazy Love" written by Van Morrison, "I" written by the Japanese group Pizzicato Five and "Miss Celie's Blues" (from the movie The Color Purple).

Crouçie d'où là is currently out of print. When Emilíana was asked by a French fansite in a 2008 interview, she responded:
"No I really don't want it to. I have a funny relationship with that record and I guess I have disowned it in someways. My mum proudly took it out of the shelves at Christmas and played it to my boyfriend. I hadn't heard it since I recorded it. It was too painful... I didn't like it. She laughed. He blushed."

Track listing
"I'm a Bad Luck Woman" (Memphis Minnie)
"Crazy Love" (Van Morrison)
"The Man with the Golden Gun" (Don Black, John Barry)
"Today I Sing the Blues" (Curtis Reginald Lewis & Jack Hammer [aka Earl Solomon Burroughs])
"I" (Pizzicato Five, Yasuharu Konishi)
"The Dirty Dozen" (J. Mayo Williams & Rufus George "Speckled Red" Perryman)
"Tomorrow" (Paul Williams)
"Find It" (Igo Kantor & Stu Phillips)
"Miss Celie's Blues" (Quincy Jones, Rod Temperton & Lionel Richie)
"Aaaa..." (V.G. Friðriksson Brekkan)

Band members
Emilíana Torrini – vocals
Jón Ólafsson – piano, vibraphone
Jóhann Hjörleifsson – drums, percussions, marimba
Guðmundur Pétursson – guitar
Sigurður Sigurðsson – munnharpa
Róbert Þorhalsson – double bass, electric bass
Haraldur Þorsteinsson – bass on tracks 2, 4, 6 & 9
Snorri Valsson – trumpet
Magnús Jónsson – tap dance

Certifications and sales

References 

1995 debut albums
Emilíana Torrini albums